Arvind is the Johnson Professor of Computer Science and Engineering in the Computer Science and Artificial Intelligence Laboratory (CSAIL) at the Massachusetts Institute of Technology (MIT). He is a Fellow of the Institute of Electrical and Electronics Engineers (IEEE) and the Association for Computing Machinery (ACM). He was also elected as a member into the National Academy of Engineering in 2008 for contributions to data flow and multi-thread computing and the development of tools for the high-level synthesis of hardware.

Career

Arvind's research interests include formal verification of large-scale digital systems using Guarded Atomic Actions, Memory Models, and Cache Coherence Protocols for parallel architectures and languages.

Past work was instrumental in the development of dynamic dataflow architectures, two parallel computing programming languages (Id and pH), and the compiling of such languages on parallel machines.

At IIT Kanpur, he earned a Bachelor of Science (B.Sc.) degree in technology (with an emphasis in electrical engineering) in 1969. In that process, he discovered that he was keenly interested in computers. Then, at the University of Minnesota, he earned a Master of Science (M.Sc.) in computer science in 1972, and a Doctor of Philosophy (Ph.D.) in computer science in 1973.

Arvind conducted his thesis research in operating systems on mathematical models of program behavior. At the University of California, Irvine, where he taught from 1974 to 1978, he became interested in computer architecture and programming languages.

Arvind then taught at IIT's Kanpur campus in 1977 and 1978.

Arvind joined the MIT faculty in 1978.

He served as the Chief Technical Advisor to the United-Nations-sponsored Knowledge Based Computer Systems project in India from 1986 to 1992. During 1992–93, he was the Fujitsu Visiting Professor at the University of Tokyo.

In 1992, Arvind and his CSAIL team collaborated with Motorola in completing the Monsoon dataflow machine and associated software. A dozen Monsoons were installed at Los Alamos National Laboratory and other universities before Monsoon was retired to the Computer History Museum in California. In 2000, Arvind took two years off from teaching at MIT to build Sandburst, Inc, a fabless manufacturing semiconductor company. He served as its president until his return to MIT in 2002. In 2003, he cofounded Bluespec, Inc, an electronic design automation (EDA) company. , he serves on the boards of both firms.

In 2006, Sandburst, headquartered in Andover, Massachusetts and providing semiconductor designs for scalable packet switching and routing systems, was acquired by Broadcom Corporation.

Bluespec, Inc., headquartered in Waltham, Massachusetts, manufactures silicon-proven electronic design automation synthesis toolsets.

He served as the General Chair for the International Conference on Supercomputing held in Cambridge, Massachusetts in June 2005. He has also served as the Engineering and Computer Science Jury Chair for the Infosys Prize from 2019 onwards.

Arvind was the first to occupy the N. Rama Rao Chair in the Department of Computer Science and Engineering at IIT. He served as chair from 1998 to 1999. Also during this time he taught a few weeks each semester at the CSE department of IIT, Kanpur.

Arvind's current research uses term-rewriting systems (TRSs) for high-level specification and description of architectures and protocols. The Computation Structures Group at MIT, which he heads, uses TRSs to design faster hardware and allow for more exploration of designs.

Published works

Along with R. S. Nikhil, Arvind published the book Implicit parallel programming in pH in 2001. "pH" is a programming language based on Haskell with special support for parallel processing.

Among the most significant and/or recent articles he authored or co-authored that have been published:

James Hoe and Arvind, "Operation-Centric Hardware Descriptions and Synthesis", IEEE TCAD, September 2004
Hari Balakrishnan, Srinivas Devadas, Doug Ehlert, and Arvind, "Rate Guarantees and Overload Protection in Input-Queued Switches", IEEE Infocom, March 2004.
Dan Rosenband and Arvind, "Modular Scheduling of Guarded Atomic Actions", DAC41, June 2004
Arvind, R.S. Nikhil, Daniel Rosenband and Nirav Dave, "High-level synthesis: An Essential Ingredient for Designing Complex ASICs", ICCAD'04, November 2004

Arvind has also served on the editorial board of several journals including the Journal of Parallel and Distributed Computing, and the Journal of Functional Programming.

Awards

Arvind has received the following awards: the IEEE Computer Society Charles Babbage Award (1994), Distinguished Alumnus Award, I.I.T. Kanpur (1999), Distinguished Alumnus Award, University of Minnesota (2001), and the Outstanding Achievement Award from the University of Minnesota (2008).

Additionally, he was selected as an IEEE Fellow in 1994 and an ACM Fellow in 2006. He was elected to the National Academy of Engineering in 2008 and is currently a member of the Computer Science and Artificial Intelligence Laboratory (CSAIL) at MIT.

References

Year of birth missing (living people)
Living people
American computer scientists
MIT School of Engineering faculty
IIT Kanpur alumni
University of Minnesota College of Science and Engineering alumni
Fellow Members of the IEEE
Fellows of the Association for Computing Machinery
American people of Indian descent
Fellows of the American Academy of Arts and Sciences
Members of the United States National Academy of Engineering